Cotylelobium burckii is a species of plant in the family Dipterocarpaceae. The species is named after W. Burck, (1848–1910), a botanist that worked on the Dipterocarpaceae and the Sapotaceae. C. burckii is a canopy tree, up to 40 m, found in kerangas forests on deep white sand podsols. The species is endemic to Borneo. It is found in at least two protected areas (Bako National Park and Gunung Mulu National Park).

References

Dipterocarpaceae
Endangered plants
Endemic flora of Borneo